Kperea is a village in the Bassar Prefecture in the Kara Region  of northern Togo.

References

External links
Satellite map at Maplandia.com

Populated places in Kara Region
Bassar Prefecture